Anomalous X-ray pulsar (AXP) 1E 1048.1-5937 was the first AXP ever observed to emit an SGR-like X-ray burst. It is also the closest magnetar to Earth located 2,759 parsecs (9,000 light-years) away in the constellation Carina.

References

Anomalous X-ray pulsars
Carina (constellation)
 Magnetars